Nicola Larini (born 19 March 1964) is an Italian racing driver. He participated in 75 Formula One Grands Prix, debuting on 6 September 1987. He finished second in the tragic 1994 San Marino Grand Prix on a substitute outing for Ferrari, but only scored points once more in his career. He enjoyed greater success in touring car racing, primarily for Alfa Romeo.

Early career
Born in Lido di Camaiore, Tuscany, Larini began car racing in Formula Italia in 1983, then moved up to Formula Abarth in 1984, placing third overall. He also started in Italian Formula Three the same season. In 1986 he won the title for Coloni in a Dallara, and briefly drove for the same team in Formula 3000 the following year.

Formula One
Larini's rapid ascendancy in motorsport continued when Coloni entered the final two European rounds of the 1987 Formula One season. Larini failed to qualify for the Italian Grand Prix, but got into the Spanish Grand Prix, only to retire early on.

For the 1988 season he was signed by the Osella Formula One team, and drew good notices for his valiant performances in the hugely uncompetitive car, with a best result of 9th in the Monaco Grand Prix. He would continue with Osella in the 1989 season, their much-improved car suffering from the lottery of pre-qualifying. However, Larini continued to shine, running 6th at the San Marino Grand Prix until a hub failure, and running third at the Canadian Grand Prix until an electrical failure. He would also qualify 10th for the Japanese Grand Prix.

The 1990 Formula One season saw a move up the grid to the Ligier team, but the well-funded French team were at a creative dead-end and the car was a distinct midfielder. A brace of seventh places were Larini's best results in a low-key year, although he easily outshone Philippe Alliot in the other Ligier.

Larini then moved to the new Modena team for the 1991 season, once again having to face pre-qualifying. He got through in the opening round, the United States Grand Prix, and held on for seventh place, but the team would develop acute financial difficulties, and were unable to progress. As a result, Larini would only qualify for four more races.

For the 1992 season, he was out of luck for a Grand Prix drive, but was signed by Ferrari to develop their active suspension system. Larini kept his racing instincts sharp by winning the Italian Touring Car Championship for Alfa Romeo, and was called up to the Ferrari Formula One team for the end of the year, replacing Ivan Capelli to race-test the active suspension car. He made a fair impression, but started both races from the back of the grid for technical reasons. However, 1993 saw more Ferrari testing and touring cars, this time taking the Deutsche Tourenwagen Meisterschaft title in Germany for Alfa Romeo.

In 1994, he would have another chance with Ferrari in Formula One, replacing the injured Jean Alesi early in the season. He qualified seventh at the Pacific Grand Prix, but along with Ayrton Senna was eliminated at the first corner by Mika Häkkinen. Then at the San Marino Grand Prix he took second place, but his first points score was overshadowed by the tragic deaths of Roland Ratzenberger and Ayrton Senna. It was back to touring cars with Alfa for the rest of the year, with Larini placing third in the German series.

Alfa would drop off the pace for the next two years, with Larini placing sixth in the German series in 1995, and 11th in the Italian series in 1996. However, 1997 would see his Ferrari connections land him a seat with Sauber, who were using rebranded Ferrari engines. Larini scored a point on his return at the Australian Grand Prix, but left after five races after a series of disagreements with Peter Sauber.

Later career
After that, Larini was a stalwart in touring cars, for Alfa Romeo for many years in the European Touring Car Championship, and between 2005 and 2009 for Chevrolet in the  WTCC (World Touring Car Championship). On November 21, 2009, he announced that he would quit his professional racing driver career, but would not stop racing completely. For example, Larini in 2016 he won Race 1 in Imola at the European Lotus Cup,  in 2017, made his NASCAR Whelen Euro Series debut at Autodromo di Franciacorta, driving the No. 1 Ford Mustang for Alex Caffi Motorsport.

Championships
 1986 – Italian Formula 3 Champion Dallara Alfa Romeo Marlboro
 1992 – Italiano Superturismo Champion –  Alfa Romeo 155 GTA turbo
 1993 – DTM Champion – Alfa Romeo 155 V6 2.5 TI DTM

Racing record

Career summary

Complete International Formula 3000 results
(key) (Races in bold indicate pole position; races in italics indicate fastest lap.)

Complete Formula One results
(key) (Races in bold indicate pole position, races in italics indicate fastest lap)

Complete Deutsche Tourenwagen Meisterschaft results
(key) (Races in bold indicate pole position) (Races in italics indicate fastest lap)

† — Retired, but was classified as he completed 90% of the winner's race distance.

Complete International Touring Car Championship results
(key) (Races in bold indicate pole position) (Races in italics indicate fastest lap)

Complete Super Tourenwagen Cup results
(key) (Races in bold indicate pole position) (Races in italics indicate fastest lap)

Complete Italian Superturismo Championship results

Complete European Touring Car Championship results
(key) (Races in bold indicate pole position) (Races in italics indicate fastest lap)

Complete World Touring Car Championship results
(key) (Races in bold indicate pole position) (Races in italics indicate fastest lap)

Complete International Superstars Series results
(key) (Races in bold indicate pole position) (Races in italics indicate fastest lap)

References

External links

1964 births
Living people
Sportspeople from the Province of Lucca
Italian racing drivers
Italian Formula One drivers
Coloni Formula One drivers
Osella Formula One drivers
Ligier Formula One drivers
Modena Formula One drivers
Ferrari Formula One drivers
Sauber Formula One drivers
World Touring Car Championship drivers
Italian Formula Three Championship drivers
TC 2000 Championship drivers
Deutsche Tourenwagen Masters champions
Deutsche Tourenwagen Masters drivers
International Formula 3000 drivers
Porsche Supercup drivers
Superstars Series drivers
European Touring Car Championship drivers
Nürburgring 24 Hours drivers
Hyundai Motorsport drivers